Dallas Earl Smith (born October 10, 1941) is a Canadian former ice hockey defenceman who played fifteen seasons for the Boston Bruins and New York Rangers of the National Hockey League between 1960 and 1978. With the Bruins Smith won the Stanley Cup in 1970 and 1972. Internationally he played for the Canadian national team at the 1977 World Championships.

Playing career
Signed as a teenager by the Bruins, after a junior career with their Estevan Bruins farm team, Smith made his debut with Boston in 1960. He played the full 1961 season with the club, but thereafter spent most of the next seven seasons in the minor leagues, winning Second All-Star Team accolades with the Oklahoma City Blazers of the CHL in 1966.

With expansion in 1967 Smith made the Bruins for good and, partnered with superstar Bobby Orr on defence, led the NHL in plus/minus the first season the statistic was officially tabulated. He gained a reputation as a solid defensive defenceman — as well as a wide repute as the league's strongest man, bolstered by his ownership of a Manitoba farm. His best season was 1971, during which he had his career high of 45 points, played in the NHL All-Star Game and finished with a plus/minus of +94, the fourth highest total in history.

Smith began the 1977 season after an acrimonious contract dispute which saw him sign a one-year contract the day before the season began, and which caused him to miss training camp. He was named interim captain of the Bruins after longtime captain John Bucyk was injured, but left the team in March after a dispute, playing for the Canadian national team in the 1977 World Championships after that. He signed as a free agent with the New York Rangers in December 1977 at the importuning of old teammate Phil Esposito, but his skills having significantly diminished, retired at season's end.

Smith finished his NHL career with 55 goals, 307 assists and 959 penalty minutes in 890 games.  He currently lives in retirement in Phoenix.

Career statistics

Regular season and playoffs

International

Awards and achievements 
CPHL Second All-Star Team (1966)
CPHL Championships (1966, 1967)
Stanley Cup Championships (1970, 1972)
Played in the NHL All-Star Game (1971, 1972, 1973, 1974)
Honoured Member of the Manitoba Hockey Hall of Fame

References

External links
 

1941 births
Living people
Boston Bruins players
Canadian ice hockey defencemen
Estevan Bruins players
Hull-Ottawa Canadiens players
Ice hockey people from Manitoba
New York Rangers players
Oklahoma City Blazers (1965–1977) players
People from Westman Region, Manitoba
Pittsburgh Hornets players
Portland Buckaroos players
San Francisco Seals (ice hockey) players
Stanley Cup champions